Perionyx is a genus of annelids belonging to the family Megascolecidae.

The genus has almost cosmopolitan distribution.

Species:

Perionyx aborensis 
Perionyx alatus 
Perionyx annandalei

References

Megascolecidae
Annelid genera